The Lawrence Street Cemetery, or more commonly known as "the Village Burying Ground", is a historic cemetery on Lawrence Street in Methuen, Massachusetts.

Methuen's third oldest cemetery, it was founded in 1832 when the center of town was shifted west from Meeting House Hill to Gaunt Square.  Late in the 19th century, wealthy industrialist Edward Searles built the 8 foot granite wall on the sides facing his estate. In the cemetery rests Searles siblings, parents and wife Mary Hopkins Searles.

The cemetery was listed on the National Register of Historic Places in 1984.

See also
 National Register of Historic Places listings in Methuen, Massachusetts

References

External links
 

Buildings and structures in Methuen, Massachusetts
Cemeteries on the National Register of Historic Places in Massachusetts
Cemeteries in Essex County, Massachusetts
National Register of Historic Places in Methuen, Massachusetts
Cemeteries established in the 1830s
1832 establishments in Massachusetts